Alfonso Calderón Atienzar (born October 10, 2001) is a Spanish-American student activist against gun violence. He is a survivor of the Stoneman Douglas High School shooting and a founding member of the Never Again MSD movement.

Early life and activism
Calderon was born in a Spanish town outside Madrid called Alcobendas, and he has been living in the United States since 2008. 

Calderon criticized lawmakers for failing to enact sensible gun laws as well as screenings to keep mentally ill people from being able to buy "military grade weapons", and he criticized the National Rifle Association (NRA) and their spokesperson Dana Loesch for encouraging gun proliferation as well as politicians funded by the NRA. He said that student voices were not being taken seriously enough. He described a proposal of arming teachers to further school safety as a "terrible idea", explaining that teachers were never meant to carry lethal weapons. He views his advocacy as more than merely protecting Parkland students but as an effort to save human lives in general. He believes that it is up to the electorate to vote out politicians who support lax gun regulations and the NRA.

During the school shooting, he was locked in a closet with fellow students for three to four hours.

Notes

References

External links
 CNN video
 MSNBC video

2001 births
Living people
American child activists
American founders
American gun control activists
American shooting survivors
People from Parkland, Florida
Stoneman Douglas High School shooting activists
People from Alcobendas
Spanish emigrants to the United States
Spanish activists
Gun politics in the United States